The Columbus Zoo and Aquarium is a non-profit zoo located near Powell in Liberty Township, Delaware County, Ohio, United States, north of the city of Columbus.  The land lies along the eastern banks of the O'Shaughnessy Reservoir on the Scioto River, at the intersection of Riverside Drive and Powell Road. It has a worldwide reputation, largely attributable to the efforts and promotion of director emeritus Jack Hanna. In 2009, it was named by the USA Travel Guide as the number one zoo in the United States.  It was also ranked number one best zoo in 2012 by Besties Readers Choice.

The Columbus Zoo is home to more than 7,000 animals representing over 800 species and sees over 2.3 million visitors annually. The animal exhibits are divided into regions of the world, with the zoo currently operating eight such regions. In addition the zoo owns an 18-hole golf course, known as the Safari Golf Club which encompasses . The zoo also owns Zoombezi Bay which encompasses . In total, the zoo owns  of land, with  dedicated to the zoo itself.

The zoo operates its own conservation program, donating money to outside programs as well as participating in their own conservation efforts. Over the past five years the zoo has contributed over $3.3 million to more than 70 projects in 30 countries. The zoo also has a close working relationship with the Wilds, a  animal conservation center located in southeast Ohio and featured on the Columbus Zoo's website.

Columbus Zoo and Aquarium, and by extension The Wilds, are prominently featured in the Nat Geo Wild series Secrets of the Zoo, a series focusing on various activities done with the animals in the zoo.

History

Early history 
The first zoo in Columbus, known as "the Zoo" was operated by the Columbus Zoological Company (not affiliated with today's Columbus Zoo). It was located in the present-day Old Beechwold Historic District in Clintonville. The zoo opened in May 1905 but closed for unknown reasons only five months later in October 1905. The former monkey house can still be seen on the property of 150 West Beechwold Boulevard where it is used as a barn. The zoo's original brick entrance can also be seen on North High Street at Beechwold Road.

The present Columbus Zoo opened in 1927 as Riverside Park on 21-acres by the O'Shaughnessy Reservoir. The zoo was initially conceived by Harry P. Wolfe, owner of the Columbus Dispatch, and the Columbus Mayor on a trip to the St. Louis in 1920 where they visited the zoo. Wolfe began purchasing exotic animals for the zoo and kept them in the Franklin Park Conservatory until the park was ready. Its first building housed lions and tigers and was completed in 1932.

In 1937, the zoo's name changed to the Columbus Municipal Zoo and utilized membership fees to fund its growth but by 1950 was struggling financially.

1950 to present 
The city of Columbus took over management of the zoo in 1951, but later gave up ownership to the Zoological Park Association, Inc., a non-profit organization, in 1970.  The city continued providing funds from the city's general fund, however, until 1986.

On December 22, 1956, Colo, a western lowland gorilla, became the world's first captive-born gorilla at the Columbus Zoo. When she died in January, 2017, at the age of 60, she was the oldest gorilla in human care. Colo's extended family includes one child, 10 grandchildren, four great grandchildren, and two great great grandchildren living in zoos throughout the country. The Columbus Zoo currently houses 15 gorillas, six of which are related to Colo. The Columbus Zoo has a gorilla breeding program, with 31 gorillas born at the zoo since 1956. Colo was named after Columbus, the city of her birth.

Jack Hanna became the director of the Columbus Zoo in 1978 and remained director until 1993.  The zoo benefited greatly from his oversight, rising to national recognition during his tenure.  Prior to his arrival, the zoo saw an average annual attendance of about 360,000.  In addition, the animal facilities were in need of renovation.  Hanna put an extensive amount of effort into turning the Columbus Zoo into a model facility, including personally picking up trash after hours.  Cage enclosures were also removed during his time and replaced with more natural looking habitats.  His enthusiasm, along with his national television recognition, helped attract more visitors to the zoo, with over 1.4 million visitors annually by 1992. Hanna was named director emeritus of the zoo in 1993, and continued to be the public face for the zoo in its marketing campaigns until 2020.

In 2004, voters passed a measure that would raise an estimated $180 million to expand the zoo over 10 years.  The  expansion includes additional parking, Polar Frontier, an exhibit including polar bears and Arctic foxes, as well as Heart of Africa, the most recent exhibit including lions, antelope, cheetahs, giraffe, zebras, etc.  To make room for these new exhibits, bordering Powell Road has been relocated around the eastern and southern border of the zoo.  A new entrance was constructed along the new roadway, which opened in early 2008. Long-term plans include the possibility of a resort-style hotel to attract tourists along with its outdoor water-amusement park, Zoombezi Bay.

On June 28, 2009, Jeff Swanagan, the executive director of the zoo, died suddenly at the age of 51. Dale Schmidt, the zoo's chief operating officer, was named executive director on November 20, 2009.

Loss of accreditation 
Additionally, zoo executives were reported by The Columbus Dispatch as having inappropriate businesses practices that used zoo resources for personal use. Zoo officials addressed the allegations, admitting to mistakes and cut ties to institutions involved but did not clarify specific issues. On October 7, 2021, the Columbus Zoo was to lose its Association of Zoos and Aquariums accredited status for financial mismanagement and animal endangerment. The zoo appealed the decision, and kept its accreditation provisionally. In December 2021 this appeal was denied, with an option to reapply in autumn 2022.

In December 2021, Tom Schmidt became the president and CEO of the Columbus Zoo. Schmidt came to Columbus from the Texas State Aquarium in Corpus Christi, Texas, and plans to improve the zoo's image and restore its accreditation.

Exhibits
The Columbus Zoo is divided into regions, each housing animals from a particular region of the world.  Each region is themed for the particular area of the world they are representing, though older regions are themed less than the newly constructed ones.  Food and souvenir shops are located throughout the zoo, each one also themed for the region the shop is in.

There are three modes of transportation through the zoo other than walking.  These include a train that circles the North America region, a tram that borders the southern part of the North America Region that takes visitors to Polar Frontier, and a boat ride around the Islands of Southeast Asia region.

Adventure Cove
Adventure Cove opened in 2020. This region contains a pool for California sea lions and harbor seals, Jack Hanna's Animal Encounter Village, and the Stingray Bay.

Featured animals include:

California sea lion (Zalophus californianus)
Harbor seal (Phoca vitulina)
Serval (Leptailurus serval) 
Red fox (Vulpes vulpes)
Bat-eared fox (Otocyon megalotis)
Blue-and-yellow macaw (Ara ararauna)
Scarlet macaw (Ara macao)
Laughing kookaburra (Dacelo novaeguineae)
Toco toucan (Ramphastos toco)
Red ruffed lemur (Varecia rubra)
Ring-tailed lemur (Lemur catta)
Capybara (Hydrochoerus hydrochaeris) 
Linnaeus's two-toed sloth (Choloepus didactylus)
Indian crested porcupine (Hystrix indica)
Crested porcupine (Hystrix cristata)
African spurred tortoise (Centrochelys sulcata)
Leopard tortoise (Stigmochelys pardalis)
Radiated tortoise (Astrochelys radiata)
Gopher tortoise (Gopherus polyphemus)
Domestic duck (Anas platyrhynchos domesticus)
African penguin (Spheniscus demersus)
Asian small-clawed otter (Aonyx cinereus)
Swift fox (Vulpes velox)
Geoffroy's cat (Leopardus geoffroyi)
Abyssinian ground hornbill (Bucorvus abyssinicus)
Red-legged seriema (Cariama cristata)
Short-beaked echidna (Tachyglossus aculeatus)
Southern three-banded armadillo (Tolypeutes matacus)
White cockatoo (Cacatua alba)
Northern greater galago (Otolemur garnettii)
Red-footed tortoise (Chelonoidis carbonarius)
Kinkajou (Potos flavus)
Virginia opossum (Didelphis virginiana)
Striped skunk (Mephitis mephitis)
Big hairy armadillo (Chaetophractus villosus)
Red-fronted macaw (Ara rubrogenys)
Eastern screech owl (Megascops asio)
Prehensile-tailed porcupine (Coendou prehensilis)
Sand cat (Felis margarita)
Colombian red-tailed boa (Boa imperator)
Southern tamandua (Tamandua tetradactyla)
American crow (Corvus brachyrhynchos)
Cownose ray (Rhinoptera bonasus)
Southern stingray (Hypanus americanus)

North America 
The North America region of the Columbus Zoo is the second-largest and the oldest. In total, North America contains 15 large exhibits featuring a wetlands area and an  migratory songbird aviary containing over 40 species.  In addition to the exhibits, the North America region contains the train ride that circles the region and travels past the open plains exhibits.

Featured animals include:

Black-tailed prairie dog (Cynomys ludovicianus)
North American beaver (Castor canadensis)
Mexican wolf (Canis lupus baileyi)
American black bear (Ursus americanus)
Wolverine (Gulo gulo)
North American river otter (Lontra canadensis)
Canada lynx (Lynx canadensis)
Cougar (Puma concolor)
Sandhill crane (Antigone canadensis)
Alaska moose (Alces alces gigas)
Pronghorn (Antilocapra americana)
American bison (Bison bison bison)
Trumpeter swan (Cygnus buccinator)
Bald eagle (Haliaeetus leucocephalus)
Reindeer (Rangifer tarandus)
Wood thrush (Hylocichla mustelina)
White-crowned sparrow (Zonotrichia leucophrys)
Northern bobwhite (Colinus virginianus)
Red-winged blackbird (Agelaius phoeniceus)
Tufted titmouse (Baeolophus bicolor)
Gray catbird (Dumetella carolinensis)
American robin (Turdus migratorius)
American goldfinch (Spinus tristis)
Baltimore oriole (Icterus galbula)
Cedar waxwing (Bombycilla cedrorum)
Rose-breasted grosbeak (Pheucticus ludovicianus)
Eastern towhee (Pipilo erythrophthalmus)
Swainson's thrush (Catharus ustulatus)
White-faced ibis (Plegadis chihi)
American golden plover (Pluvialis dominica)
Brown-headed cowbird (Molothrus ater)
Orchard oriole (Icterus spurius)
White-throated sparrow (Zonotrichia albicollis)
Grey-cheeked thrush (Catharus minimus)
Sora (Porzana carolina)
Mourning dove (Zenaida macroura)
Indigo bunting (Passerina cyanea)
Dark-eyed junco (Junco hyemalis)
Scarlet tanager (Piranga olivacea)
Eastern bluebird (Sialia sialis)
Blue-winged teal (Spatula discors)
Killdeer (Charadrius vociferus)
Snow goose (Anser caerulescens)
Virginia rail (Rallus limicola)
Song sparrow (Melospiza melodia)
Hooded merganser (Lophodytes cucullatus)
Northern pintail (Anas acuta)
Bufflehead (Bucephala albeola)
Wood duck (Aix sponsa)
Ruddy duck (Oxyura jamaicensis)
Chicken (Gallus gallus domesticus) 
Dexter cattle (Bos taurus) 
Jacob's sheep (Ovis aries) 
Barbados Blackbelly sheep (Ovis aries)
Nigerian Dwarf goat (Capra hircus)
Angora goat (Capra hircus)

Polar Frontier

Polar Frontier opened in May 2010 as an extension of the North America region, featuring animals native to colder climates including Arctic foxes and brown bears.  The region also marked the return of polar bears to the zoo, whose habitat includes a  pool and an underwater viewing area. The center of the exhibit includes a Conservation/Education Building and a new play area. The zoo added a third polar bear in 2013 and further expanded Polar Frontier in 2014. In 2015, one of the bears in the Polar Frontier, Aurora, gave birth to a bear cub, which the zoo named Nora.

Featured animals include:
Alaska Peninsula brown bear (Ursus arctos gyas)
Arctic fox (Vulpes lagopus)
Polar bear (Ursus maritimus)

Asia Quest

Asia Quest opened two phases in 2006. The region is an attempt to more fully immerse visitors into the exhibits, not only building larger and more attractive exhibits, but also melding them together with the scenery. Visitors entering Asia Quest pass a waterfall flanked by two habitats, travel through a cave containing the indoor habitats, exit into a Chinese forest, and finally enter an Asia Quest aviary designed to look like an abandoned Asian garden. Instead of fences, habitats are either recessed and separated via rock walls, or on ground level and separated by the rock walls and glass. Asia Quest also promotes donations for animal conservation, as many of the region's animals are threatened in the wild.

Featured animals include:

Tufted deer (Elaphodus cephalophus cephalophus)
Siberian musk deer (Moschus moschiferus)
Red-crowned crane (Grus japonensis)
Malaysian giant turtle (Orlitia borneensis)
Silvered leaf langur (Trachypithecus cristatus)
Asian water monitor (Varanus salvator)
Reticulated python (Malayopython reticulatus)
Little golden-mantled flying fox (Pteropus pumilus)
Large flying fox (Pteropus vampyrus)
Blue-faced honeyeater (Entomyzon cyanotis)
Greater Malay chevrotain (Tragulus napu)
Burmese mountain tortoise (Manouria emys)
Sloth bear (Melursus ursinus)
Red panda (Ailurus fulgens)
Reeves's muntjac (Muntiacus reevesi)
Smew duck (Mergellus albellus)
Northern shoveler (Spatula clypeata)
Azure-winged magpie (Cyanopica cyanus)
Cabot's tragopan (Tragopan caboti)
Reeves's pheasant (Syrmaticus reevesii)
White-crested laughingthrush (Garrulax leucolophus)
Javan pond heron (Ardeola speciosa)
Black-throated laughingthrush (Pterorhinus chinensis)
Mountain bamboo partridge (Bambusicola fytchii)
Western cattle egret (Bubulcus ibis)
Magpie goose (Anseranas semipalmata)
Nicobar pigeon (Caloenas nicobarica)
Markhor (Capra falconeri)
Pallas's cat (Otocolobus manul)
Amur tiger (Panthera tigris tigris)
Indian elephant (Elphas maximus indicus)
Indian rhinoceros (Rhinoceros unicornis)

Fluffy

In March 2007, Fluffy, a reticulated python (Malayopython reticulatus) and Guinness World Records holder for the longest snake in captivity, measuring 24 feet, was put on display at the zoo. In September 2007, the zoo purchased Fluffy from her owner, and she was on permanent display afterwards. On October 26, 2010, the 300 pound, 18-year-old snake died. A necropsy found a tumorous mass on one of her ovaries. The zoo has since acquired her daughter named Hanna.

Shores & Aquarium

The shores region is most well known for the fish and manatee aquariums, known as "Discovery Reef" and "Manatee Coast". In addition to the indoor aquariums, the shores region also features exhibits of Caribbean flamingos, American alligators, Humboldt penguins, and Aldabra giant tortoises.

Discovery Reef is an  saltwater aquarium and houses numerous species of fish, seahorses, sharks, and garden eels. It also houses a live coral exhibit, one of the largest in the United States although the coral in the largest tank is synthetic.

Manatee Coast, which opened in 1999, is the cornerstone of the region, supporting the endangered Florida manatees, fish, stingrays, a sea turtle, and pelicans in a  indoor habitat. This habitat is one of only two outside of Florida to keep manatees, making it an especially popular exhibit. The building is also covered by a retractable roof, which creates an outdoor environment for up to five manatees during warm weather.

The Reptile Habitat is the first building encountered heading west after exiting the tunnel under Riverside Drive and is located within the shores region. It is a fully indoor facility, containing numerous snakes, terrapins, lizards, and tortoises. The Columbus Zoo has also bred many threatened reptile species, including Jamaican boas, Madagascar ground boas, yellow-spotted river turtles, Roti Island snake-necked turtles, and eastern plains garter snakes.

Featured animals include:

Florida manatee (Trichechus manatus latirostris)
Hawksbill sea turtle (Eretmochelys imbricata)
Brown pelican (Pelecanus occidentalis)
Humboldt penguin (Spheniscus humboldti)
Caribbean flamingo (Phoenicopterus ruber)
Nene (Branta sandvicensis)
Roti Island snake-necked turtle (Chelodina mccordi)
Spotted turtle (Clemmys guttata)
Yellow-spotted river turtle (Podocnemis unifilis)
Barbour's map turtle (Graptemys barbouri)
Yellow-blotched map turtle (Graptemys flavimaculata)
Pig-nosed turtle (Carettochelys insculpta)
Alligator snapping turtle (Macrochelys temminckii)
Pancake tortoise (Malacochersus tornieri)
Spider tortoise (Pyxis arachnoides)
Coahuilan box turtle (Terrapene coahuila)
Indian star tortoise (Geochelone elegans)
Aldabra giant tortoise (Aldabrachelys gigantea)
Malaysian giant turtle (Orlitia borneensis)
Madagascar ground boa (Boa madagascariensis)
Malagasy giant hognose (Leioheterodon madagascariensis)
Jamaican boa (Epicrates subflavus)
Rainbow boa (Epicrates cenchria)
Burmese python (Python bivittatus)
Blood python (Python curtus)
Ball python (Python regius)
Scrub python (Simalia amethistina)
Savu python (Liasis mackloti savuensis)
West African burrowing python (Calabaria reinhardtii)
Pine snake (Pituophis melanoleucus)
Plains garter snake (Thamnophis radix)
Western cottonmouth (Agkistrodon piscivorus leucostoma)
Black rat snake (Pantherophis obsoletus)
Eastern green mamba (Dendroaspis angusticeps) 
King cobra (Ophiophagus hannah)
Red spitting cobra (Naja pallida)
Eastern copperhead (Agkistrodon contortrix)
Timber rattlesnake (Crotalus horridus)
Massasauga (Sistrurus catenatus)
Solomon Islands skink (Corucia zebrata)
Gila monster (Heloderma suspectum)
Smooth-fronted caiman ( Paleosuchus trigonatus)
San Esteban chuckwalla (Sauromalus varius)
Macklot's python (Liasis mackloti)
Sidewinder (Crotalus cerastes)
Grand Cayman blue iguana (Cyclura lewisi)
Black spiny-tailed iguana (Ctenosaura similis)
American alligator (Alligator mississippiensis)
Titicaca water frog (Telmatobius culeus)
Panamanian golden frog (Atelopus zeteki)
Blue poison dart frog (Dendrobates tinctorius "azureus")
Axolotl (Ambystoma mexicanum)
Hellbender (Cryptobranchus alleganiensis)
Angelfish
Bonnethead (Sphyrna tiburo)
Butterflyfishes 
Cardinalfish 
Surgeonfish
Sailfin snapper (Symphorichthys spilurus)
Orbicular batfish (Platax orbicularis)
Cownose ray (Rhinoptera bonasus)
Southern stingray (Hypanus americanus)
Clownfish
Rabbitfish 
Zebra shark (Stegostoma fasciatum)
Pot-bellied seahorse (Hippocampus abdominalis)
Spotted garden eel (Heteroconger hassi)

Congo Expedition

The African forest region, "Congo Expedition," opened in 2000 and showcases animals from the Central African rainforest, which includes numerous primates, hooved mammals, large cats, and many birds housed in an aviary.  The highlight of the region is the primate area featuring three generations of western lowland gorillas, the progeny of Colo, the first gorilla to be born in captivity in the world.

The Columbus Zoo has a rapidly expanding group of bonobos, also known as pygmy chimpanzees.  Bonobos are the closest living relative to humans and are only found at eight U.S. zoos and less than 20 worldwide zoos outside their native Democratic Republic of the Congo, where they are critically endangered.

On May 18, 2012, one of the zoo's gorillas, Mumbah, died of heart failure at the age of 47. Mumbah had been part of the Columbus Zoo since 1984, when he was acquired from an animal park in England.

Featured animals include:

Mantled guereza (Colobus guereza)
Grey parrot (Psittacus erithacus)
Ross's turaco (Musophaga rossae)
African sacred ibis (Threskiornis aethiopicus)
Hadada ibis (Bostrychia hagedash)
Black crowned crane (Balearica pavonina)
Tambourine dove (Turtur tympanistria)
Superb starling (Lamprotornis superbus)
White-headed buffalo weaver (Dinemellia dinemelli)
Common bulbul (Pycnonotus barbatus)
Speckled pigeon (Columba guinea)
Hamerkop (Scopus umbretta)
Blue-bellied roller (Coracias cyanogaster)
Buff-crested bustard (Lophotis gindiana)
Black crake (Zapornia flavirostra)
Hottentot teal (Spatula hottentota)
Radiated tortoise (Astrochelys radiata)
African leopard (Panthera pardus pardus)
Western lowland gorilla (Gorilla gorilla gorilla)
Red river hog (Potamochoerus porcus)
Bonobo (Pan paniscus)
Mandrill (Mandrillus sphinx)
Okapi (Okapia johnstoni)

Australia and the Islands

The Australia region is located on the far west side of the zoo, lying along the east bank of the Scioto River. The "Roadhouse" nocturnal exhibit opened in November 2003, while the kangaroo walkabout, koala habitat, and Lorikeet Aviary opened in 2004. "Bob and Evelyn's Roadhouse" is an indoor nocturnal exhibit displaying animals from Southeast Asia, Australia, and New Zealand. The Roadhouse features animals including Indian crested porcupine, North Island brown kiwi, and binturong. The final section of the Roadhouse is an indoor flight aviary displaying over twenty species of Asian and Australian birds. The regions feature habitat is the kangaroo walkabout exhibit, which houses red kangaroos and eastern grey kangaroos. The habitat is at ground-level, which allows visitors to walk through the actual habitat along with the kangaroos. The Columbus Zoo is one of only eight US zoos to permanently house koalas and is one of the few US zoos to display the species in both outdoor and indoor habitats. The exhibit in the region is Lorikeet Garden featuring rainbow lorikeets. The exhibit allows visitors to purchase a cup of nectar and feed the birds. In 2019, the Tasmanian devil exhibit opened, featuring the Tasmanian devils.

Featured Roadhouse animals include:

Tawny frogmouth (Podargus strigoides)
Brush-tailed bettong (Bettongia penicillata)
North Island brown kiwi (Apteryx mantelli)
Binturong (Arctictis binturong)
Halmahera giant gecko (Gehyra marginata)
Crested gecko (Correlophus ciliatus)
Matschie's tree-kangaroo (Dendrolagus matschiei)
Feathertail glider (Acrobates pygmaeus)
Indian crested porcupine (Hystrix indica)
Southern hairy-nosed wombat (Lasiorhinus latifrons)
Laughing kookaburra (Dacelo novaeguineae)
Luzon bleeding-heart (Gallicolumba luzonica)
Masked lapwing (Vanellus miles)
Freckled duck (Stictonetta naevosa)
Metallic starling (Aplonis metallica)
Magpie goose (Anseranas semipalmata)
Chestnut teal (Anas castanea))
Straw-necked ibis (Threskiornis spinicollis)
Victoria crowned pigeon (Goura victoria)
Pied imperial pigeon (Ducula bicolor)
Nicobar pigeon (Caloenas nicobarica)
Bali myna (Leucopsar rothschildi)
Eastern rosella (Platycercus eximius)
Spotted whistling duck (Dendrocygna guttata)
Black-naped fruit dove (Ptilinopus melanospilus)
Lesser masked weaver (Ploceus intermedius)
Red-billed leiothrix (Leiothrix lutea)
Scarlet-faced liocichla (Liocichla ripponi)

Featured outdoor animals include:

Koala (Phascolarctos cinereus)
Tasmanian devil (Sarcophilus harrisii)
Eastern grey kangaroo (Macropus giganteus)
Red kangaroo (Osphranter rufus)
Rainbow lorikeet (Trichoglossus moluccanus)

The Islands of Southeast Asia region opened in 2003. Similarly to Asia Quest, Islands of Southeast Asia attempts to be more immersive, melding the exhibits and scenery to create the feeling that the visitor is walking through one continuous exhibit.  This is done mostly with man-made scenery and vegetation.  Included in the man-made scenery is a waterway that flows around the region and carries the boat ride from which visitors can view the region's exhibits.

Featured animals include:

White-handed gibbon (Hylobates lar)
Siamang (Symphalangus syndactylus)
Bornean orangutan (Pongo pygmaeus)
Asian small-clawed otter (Aonyx cinereus)
Black swan (Cygnus atratus) 
Dalmatian pelican (Pelecanus crispus)
Komodo dragon (Varanus komodoensis)

Heart of Africa

The "Heart of Africa" region is located to the north and east of the zoo. The area encompasses  of land, and feature many African plains animals. One exhibit in the new region are lions, which were moved in order to accommodate Asia Quest, as well as giraffes, cheetahs, zebras, and vervet monkeys. Following the design of recent exhibits such as the Islands of Southeast Asia, the African savanna attempts to merge habitats and scenery to make visitors feel as if they are on the plains. Other features including giraffe feedings, camel rides, as well as dining facilities.

Featured animals include:

Dromedary camel (Camelus dromedarius)
African lion (Panthera leo)
Cheetah (Acinonyx jubatus)
Vervet monkey (Cercopithecus aethiops)
Masai giraffe (Giraffa tippelskirchi)
Reticulated giraffe (Giraffa reticulata)
Grant's zebra (Equus quagga boehmi)
Dama gazelle (Nanger dama)
Thomson's gazelle (Eudorcas thomsonii)
Rhim gazelle (Gazella leptoceros)
Greater kudu (Tragelaphus strepsiceros)
Blue wildebeest (Connochaetes taurinus)
Ostrich (Struthio camelus)
Grey crowned crane (Balearica regulorum)
Saddle-billed stork (Ephippiorhynchus senegalensis)
Helmeted guineafowl (Numida meleagris)

The centerpiece of the Heart of Africa exhibit is the Watering Hole, an open rotational enclosure containing a large pond. The exhibit is designed to accommodate many different species, and different animals rotate in and out throughout the day. Some of the zoo's species can only be viewed at the Watering Hole.

Featured Watering Hole animals include:
Cheetah (Acinonyx jubatus)
Lesser flamingo ( Phoeniconaias minor)
Trumpeter hornbill (Bycanistes bucinator)
Silvery-cheeked hornbill (Bycanistes brevis)
Spotted hyena (Crocuta crocuta)
Black-backed jackal (Canis mesomelas)
Common warthog (Phacochoerus africanus)
Aardvark (Orycteropus afer)

Other attractions

Mangels-Illions Carousel

In the spring of 2000, the zoo added its restored 1914 Mangels-Illions carousel. This carousel had originally been built for the former Olentangy Park in Clintonville. When the park closed in 1938, the carousel was moved to Wyandot Lake where it continued operating for sixty years, though in deteriorating condition. In 1999, the carousel was removed from Wyandot Lake and underwent a million dollar restoration before being moved to a new location at the zoo. With 52 hand carved horses, 2 chariots, and a Wurlitzer #153 band organ (which plays upon request), this rare "grand carousel" in the Coney Island style is one of only a few manufactured by the William F. Mangels Company with wooden horses carved by M. C. Illions and Sons Carousell Works, and is thus known as a Mangels-Illions carousel. It was ridden 42,000 times in its first month of operation at the zoo, and celebrated its one millionth rider on July 28, 2004.

Zoombezi Bay

The zoo purchased Wyandot Lake at the end of 2006 and have renovated the park into "Zoombezi Bay".  The water park opened in May 2008 and contains 17 major slides and attractions.

Rides At Adventure Cove

When the zoo bought Wyandot Lake, it split the park into two sections. They used "Jungle Jack's Landing" as the name for the dry ride section of the park when it first opened in May 2008 alongside Zoombezi Bay, it features 14 rides and attractions, including the historical Sea Dragon roller coaster. In 2020, "Jungle Jack's Landing" was renamed to "Rides At Adventure Cove" to tie into the neighboring Adventure Cove area of the Columbus Zoo and Aquarium which opened for the first time on the same year.

Conservation

The Columbus Zoo and Aquarium runs a conservation program that funds multiple projects outside of the zoo.  In 2010, the zoo provided more than $2 million worth of grants to support conservation projects worldwide.  These monies come from fundraisers, visitor donations and privately raised funds. Projects the zoo supports include the Dian Fossey Gorilla Fund, the International Elephant Foundation, and the Ohio Wildlife Center.

In an effort to increase funding for, and public awareness of, the conservation projects around the world, the Columbus Zoo has in recent years incorporated information about threatened and endangered species into exhibits.  In addition to helping visitors become more aware, the zoo has also added donation boxes that help fund the many projects the Columbus Zoo supports.

The Columbus Zoo is also involved in conservation programs internally.  Manatee Coast, while built as an exhibit, is also a rehabilitation facility for injured manatees. Due to the threatened status of manatees in the wild, Manatee Coast attempts to inform its visitors of the manatee's situation, with an entire room dedicated to manatee conservation.  This room includes a video describing the manatee's natural habitat and what can be done to protect them.

The Columbus Zoo also runs a breeding program for Mexican wolves.  This program has the goal of having a population of at least 100 wolves living in what was once their natural range. Mexican wolves became extinct in the wild in the mid-20th century due to being trapped, poisoned, and shot. Since the zoo became involved in 1992, 29 pups have been born at their facility.

Notes

External links

Protected areas of Delaware County, Ohio
Zoos in Ohio
Tourist attractions in Delaware County, Ohio
Zoos established in 1927
1927 establishments in Ohio